Ulla, My Ulla (Swedish: Ulla min Ulla) is a 1930 Swedish historical drama film directed by Julius Jaenzon and starring Torsten Winge, Åke Claesson and Greta Söderberg. It is based on a play about the eighteenth century composer Carl Michael Bellman, and takes its title from one of his most popular songs.

The film's sets were designed by the art director Vilhelm Bryde.

Cast

References

Bibliography 
 Goble, Alan. The Complete Index to Literary Sources in Film. Walter de Gruyter, 1999.

External links 
 

1930 films
1930s Swedish-language films
Films directed by Julius Jaenzon
Films set in Stockholm
Films set in the 18th century
1930s historical drama films
Swedish historical drama films
Swedish black-and-white films
1930 drama films
1930s Swedish films